Scaria may refer to:
 A frazione of the comune of Alta Valle Intelvi
 Scaria (grasshopper), a genus of grasshoppers in the family Tetrigidae